Charles Henri Georges Pouchet (26 February 1833 – 29 March 1894) was a French naturalist and anatomist.

Life 
He was born in Rouen, the son of naturalist Félix Archimède Pouchet (1800–1872). In 1865 he became chief of anatomical work at the Muséum national d'histoire naturelle in Paris, and was later co-director of the maritime laboratory at Concarneau. From 1879 to 1894 he was professor of comparative anatomy at the Muséum national d'histoire naturelle. In 1892 he was part of an early scientific polar expedition to Svalbard and Jan Mayen.

Works 
Pouchet made contributions in several scientific fields, and specialised in comparative anatomy of fishes and whales. He was a prime advocate of polygenism, and was the author of an anthropological work titled De la Pluralité des races humaines (1858), which was translated into English as The Plurality of the Human Race in 1864 by the Anthropological Society.

Selected writings 
 De la Pluralité des races humaines, 1858
 Journal de l’anatomie et de la physiologie (Journal of anatomy and physiology), with Charles-Philippe Robin (1821–1885), 1878
 Mémoire sur le grand fourmilier (Discourse on the giant anteater), 1874
 Precis d'histologie humaine et d'histogénie (Treatise of histology and human histogeny), with Frédéric Tourneux (1851–1922), 1878
 La Biologie aristotélique (Aristotlean biology), 1885
 Rapport sur le laboratoire de Concarneau (Report on the laboratory at Concarneau), 1888
 Traité d'ostéologie comparée (Treatise of comparative osteology), with H. Beauregard, 1889.

References 

 New York Times, Obituary of Georges Pouchet
 

French anatomists
French zoologists
French naturalists
Scientists from Rouen
Burials at Père Lachaise Cemetery
1833 births
1894 deaths
National Museum of Natural History (France) people